Fenouillèdes is a French comarca and a traditional Occitan-speaking area in the département of Pyrénées-Orientales. The capital of the comarca is Saint-Paul-de-Fenouillet (Sant Pau de Fenolhet).

Fenouillèdes has been part of France since the Treaty of Corbeil of 1258. In 1790, during the French Revolution, it was incorporated in a newly created département along with the Roussillon comarques.

See also
 Corbières Massif

External links 
 information site in French
 La Fenolleda Information and history in Catalan Encyclopaedia.

 
Geography of Pyrénées-Orientales